Straggle Creek is a stream in the municipality of Dysart et al, Haliburton County in Central Ontario, Canada. It is a right tributary of Allen Creek and is in the Ottawa River drainage basin.

Course
It flows north to the southwest end of Straggle Lake, then continues north from the northwest end of the lake to the south end of Little Straggle Lake. Allen Creek flows via Benoir Lake, the York River, and the Madawaska River to the Ottawa River.

References

Rivers of Haliburton County